The Sana'a Turkish Memorial Cemetery is a burial ground of Ottoman soldiers in Sana'a, Yemen.

Inaugurated in 2011 after renovation, the Turkish Memorial Cemetery holds remains of soldiers, who fell during World War I, and commemorates the four-centuries-long presence of Ottoman Empire in Yemen. It is situated next to the former Ottoman Army barracks in the Yemeni capital city, today General Staff headquarters of the Yemen Armed Forces. Turkish high officials visiting Yemen pay tribute at the cemetery.

See also
 Yemen Eyalet (1517–1872)
 Yemen Vilayet (1872–1918)
 Arab Revolt (1916–1918)

References

Buildings and structures in Sanaa
Buildings and structures completed in 2011
Turkish military memorials and cemeteries outside Turkey
World War I cemeteries